The 2012 Power Horse World Team Cup was a tennis tournament played on outdoor clay courts. It was the 34th edition of the World Team Cup, and was part of the 250 series of the 2012 ATP World Tour. It took place at the Rochusclub in Düsseldorf, Germany from May 20–26, 2012.

Points

Players
The field was announced earlier, with Japan receiving a wild card later on.

Red Group

Tomáš Berdych (#7)
Radek Štěpánek (#25)
František Čermák (#21 Doubles)

Andy Roddick (#27)
Ryan Harrison (#57)
James Blake (#98)

Juan Ignacio Chela (#37)
Carlos Berlocq (#38)
Leonardo Mayer (#68)
Juan Pablo Brzezicki (#433)

Go Soeda (#61)
Tatsuma Ito (#70)
Bumpei Sato (#785)

Blue Group

Janko Tipsarević (#8)
Viktor Troicki (#29)
Nenad Zimonjić (#6 Doubles)
Miki Janković (#887)

Philipp Kohlschreiber (#24)
Florian Mayer (#28)
Philipp Petzschner (#93)
Christopher Kas (#22 Doubles)

Alex Bogomolov Jr. (#44)
Dmitry Tursunov (#86)
Igor Kunitsyn (#87)

Ivo Karlović (#60)
Ivan Dodig (#74)
Lovro Zovko (#89 Doubles)

Round robin

Red Group

Standings

Argentina vs United States

Czech Republic vs Japan

Argentina vs Japan

Czech Republic vs United States

Czech Republic vs Argentina

United States vs Japan

Blue Group

Standings

Croatia vs Serbia

Germany vs Russia

Croatia vs Germany

Serbia vs Russia

Serbia vs Germany

Russia vs Croatia

Final

References

External links
 Official website
 Main Draw

Power Horse ATP World Team Championship
Power Horse World Team Cup
World Team Cup